Roderick Frazier Nash is a professor emeritus of history and environmental studies at the University of California Santa Barbara.  He was the first person to descend the Tuolumne River using a raft.

Scholarly biography 
Nash received his Bachelor of Arts from Harvard University in 1960 and his Ph.D. from the University of Wisconsin–Madison in 1965.  He is the author of several books and many essays. His dissertation, "Wilderness and the American Mind," done under the supervision of Merle Curti, became what has come to be seen as one of the foundational texts of the field of environmental history. After teaching for two years at Dartmouth College, he was called to the growing History Department at the University of California, Santa Barbara where he joined distinguished historians such as Wilbur Jacobs, Robert O. Collins, Frank J. Frost, C. Warren Hollister, Leonard Marsak, and Joachim Remak. After witnessing a massive oil spill in Santa Barbara in 1969, he and a number of other faculty members became active within the University and founded an environmental studies program there in 1970.  Since the initial 12 graduates in 1972, there have been 4,000 graduates within 300 separate majors.  Nash is a firm believer in environmental education and is also an avid white-water river rafter.

Wilderness and the American Mind 

Nash's study in this book concerns the attitude of Americans' toward the idea of wilderness. He discusses the different attitudes that American's have had toward nature since colonization and the changing uses and definitions of 'wilderness' in that context. Specifically, Nash describes the evolution of American wilderness conception through Transcendentalism, Primitivism, Preservationism, to Conservationism.  Nash states that if wilderness is to survive, we must, paradoxically, manage wilderness – at the very least, our behavior towards the wilderness must be managed.

Personal Philosophy 

Nash presents America's anthropocentric view as the main enemy to all wilderness preservation. He argues that an ecocentric view is ideal and may work in the long run, but perhaps the preservation of nature and wilderness for the sake of holding resources out for the preservation of our own species would be more salient. Yet, even this strategy is difficult for people to grasp, as it requires us to reach outside the present and look to the future. Still, Nash suggests that maybe the simple preservation of the environment for the sake of our own generation's recreation and health (oxygen sinks, etc.) could provide the impetus to slow some profiteering.

Nash also talks of how wilderness teaches us the value of humility. The problem is that humanity does not want to be humbled.  Humans are a proud species who will do anything to avoid being humbled.  To this end, we have ripped the wildness from the wilderness and removed all that causes any threat to our existence.

Nash believes that humankind has two choices in the next 1,000 years. We can "trash the planet into a wasteland" or adopt a plan to distill the world's population in 500 "islands" while allowing wilderness to flourish around us.

Bibliography 
Wilderness and the American Mind (1967).
The American Environment: Readings in the History of Conservation (1968).
The Call of the Wild 1900–1916 (1970).
Environment and Americans: The Problem of Priorities (1972).
The Big Drops: Ten Legendary Rapids (1978). Co-authored with Robert O. Collins
The Rights of Nature: A History of Environmental Ethics (1989).
American Environmentalism: Readings in Conservation History (1990).
The Nervous Generation: American Thought, 1917–1930 (1990).

Also by Nash, Roderick:
From These Beginnings: A Biographical Approach to American History, Volume I and II.

References

Harvard University alumni
21st-century American historians
21st-century American male writers
Environmental historians
Living people
Year of birth missing (living people)
University of Wisconsin–Madison alumni
University of California, Santa Barbara faculty
American non-fiction environmental writers
Environmental studies scholars
Activists from California
American male non-fiction writers